Brahea aculeata is a species of flowering plant in the family Arecaceae. This palm tree is endemic to northwestern Mexico, where it is native to Durango, Sinaloa, and Sonora states. It is a vulnerable species, threatened by habitat loss.

References

aculeata
Endemic flora of Mexico
Trees of Durango
Trees of Sinaloa
Trees of Sonora
Taxonomy articles created by Polbot
Flora of the Sierra Madre Occidental